Nicolas Goussé (born 2 January 1976) is a French former professional footballer who played as a forward who is the assistant coach of Ligue 2 club Annecy.

Career
Goussé was born in Thouars, France. He helped Troyes become one of the winners of the 2001 UEFA Intertoto Cup. In the final Troyes beat Newcastle United on away goals after the second leg finished 4–4 at St James' Park; Goussé scored one of Troyes' goals.

He joined Evian Thonon Gaillard in January 2009.

Honours
Troyes
UEFA Intertoto Cup: 2001

References

External links
 lequipe.fr
 
 Profile - FC Metz

1976 births
Living people
French footballers
Association football forwards
Ligue 1 players
Ligue 2 players
Championnat National players
Thouars Foot 79 players
Stade Rennais F.C. players
FC Metz players
ES Troyes AC players
En Avant Guingamp players
R.A.E.C. Mons players
FC Istres players
FC Nantes players
Thonon Evian Grand Genève F.C. players
French expatriate footballers
French expatriate sportspeople in Belgium
Expatriate footballers in Belgium